Wilfried Kwassi Eza (born 28 December 1996) is an Ivorian professional footballer who plays for Ararat-Armenia.

Career
On 4 June 2021, Eza was one of 15 plays to leave FC Van at the end of the 2020–21, signing for Ararat-Armenia on 25 June 2021.

Career statistics

Club

References

External links 
 
 

1996 births
Living people
Ivorian footballers
Association football forwards
Ivorian expatriate footballers
Expatriate footballers in Moldova
Expatriate footballers in Belarus
Expatriate footballers in Armenia
Ivorian expatriate sportspeople in Moldova
Ivorian expatriate sportspeople in Belarus
Ivorian expatriate sportspeople in Armenia
FC Saxan players
FC Gomel players
FC Noah players
FC Van players
FC Ararat-Armenia players